Osmar Strait (‘Protok Osmar’ \'pro-tok os-'mar\) is the   wide strait in the South Shetland Islands, Antarctica between Smith Island to the northwest and Low Island to the southeast.

The strait is named after the settlement of Osmar in northeastern Bulgaria.

Location
British mapping in 2009, Bulgarian mapping of the Smith Island's coast of the strait in 2009 and 2017.

Maps
 L.L. Ivanov. Antarctica: Livingston Island and Greenwich, Robert, Snow and Smith Islands. Scale 1:120000 topographic map. Troyan: Manfred Wörner Foundation, 2010.  (First edition 2009. )
 South Shetland Islands: Smith and Low Islands. Scale 1:150000 topographic map No. 13677. British Antarctic Survey, 2009.
Antarctic Digital Database (ADD). Scale 1:250000 topographic map of Antarctica. Scientific Committee on Antarctic Research (SCAR). Since 1993, regularly upgraded and updated.
 L.L. Ivanov. Antarctica: Livingston Island and Smith Island. Scale 1:100000 topographic map. Manfred Wörner Foundation, 2017.

References
 Bulgarian Antarctic Gazetteer. Antarctic Place-names Commission. (details in Bulgarian, basic data in English)
 Osmar Strait. SCAR Composite Antarctic Gazetteer

External links
 Osmar Strait. Copernix satellite image

Straits of the South Shetland Islands
Bulgaria and the Antarctic
Bodies of water of Smith Island (South Shetland Islands)